Albion is a town in northeast Pushmataha County, Oklahoma, United States, approximately  south of the Pushmataha-Latimer county line. The population was 106 at the 2010 census. When Albion was established, before Oklahoma became a state, the community was located in Wade County, Choctaw Nation, in what was then known as Indian Territory.

History 
A United States Post Office opened at this location on December 6, 1887. Charles F. Igo was the first postmaster.

In its early days, Albion was a sawmill town in the Indian Territory. Later, it became a trading center in an agricultural region in which cotton and other crops were grown.

During 1885–6, the St. Louis-San Francisco Railway, more popularly known as the "Frisco", built a line from north to south through the Choctaw Nation, connecting Fort Smith, Arkansas, with Paris, Texas. The site of Albion was selected because of its proximity to the Kiamichi River, with its abundant water supply. Adjacent station stops were established at Talihina to the north and Kiamichi to the south.

The railroad paralleled the Kiamichi River throughout much of its route in present-day Pushmataha County. Train stations were established every few miles to aid in opening up the land and, more particularly, to serve as the locations of section houses. Supervisors for their respective miles of track lived in the section houses to administer the track and its right-of-way. These stations also served as points at which the trains could draw water.

Few roads or trails existed. Transportation was provided by the Frisco Railroad, which offered six trains per day — three in each direction — until it closed to passenger traffic during the late 1950s. The railroad continued freight operations until 1981, when it closed altogether and its rails were removed. The loss of passenger rail fortunately coincided with the construction of U.S. Highway 271.

At the time of its founding, Albion was located in Wade County, Choctaw Nation.

Albion has more in common economically with Talihina, the town to its north. Planners of the proposed State of Sequoyah, who in 1905 proposed a state to be formed from the Indian Territory, realized this, and called for Albion to be the southernmost town in a county, Wade County, which was also to include Talihina and towns to its north, and stretch far to the north and west. Instead, Sequoyah was not admitted to the Union by Congress, and in the state of Oklahoma which followed it, Albion became the northeasternmost town of a county whose geographic and population centers are far to Albion's southwest.

Albion prospered during its first few decades. Most business was centered on a town square, with residential neighborhoods ringing the square. During recent decades, however, it has diminished greatly. United States Census returns show it dropping from a high of 300 residents in 1920 to just 88 in 1990. More information on Albion may be found in the Pushmataha County Historical Society.

Albion became home to an internationally known poet and author when Mato Kosyk, or Kossick, moved to the town in 1912. Locating there because its climate was considered healthy and its views of the Kiamichi Mountains were scenic, Kosyk lived for the next 28 years there, until his death in 1940. Kosyk, a Lutheran minister, migrated to the United States from Werben, Lower Lusatia, Germany in 1883. He is considered one of the most significant writers in Sorbian, a Slavic language, and his 150th birthday was celebrated by his followers in Europe in 2003. Kosyk may not have fared well during his years in Albion; according to accounts he was swindled and defrauded by unscrupulous residents.

In 1979, the Mato Kosyk House in Albion was entered into the NRHP. It is considered significant as the only surviving structure associated with the famous poet.

The post office in Albion was scheduled for possible closure by the US Postal Service in 2012.

Geography
Using the statewide grid commonly in use in Oklahoma, Albion's coordinates are T2-2N-R21E.

Demographics

At the 2010 census, there were 106 people living in the town. The population density was 530 per square mile (180/km2).  There were 62 housing units at an average density of 261 per square mile (101/km2).

At the time of the 2000 census, the racial makeup of the town was 83.92% White, 12.59% Native American and 3.50% from two or more races.

There were 53 households, of which 32.1% had children under the age of 18 living with them, 50.9% were married couples living together, 11.3% had a female householder with no husband present, and 35.8% were non-families. 34.0% of all households were made up of individuals, and 20.8% had someone living alone who was 65 years of age or older. The average household size was 2.70 and the average family size was 3.56.

36.4% of the population were under the age of 18, 4.2% from 18 to 24, 24.5% from 25 to 44, 18.2% from 45 to 64, and 16.8% who were 65 years of age or older. The median age was 34 years. For every 100 females, there were 70.2 males. For every 100 females age 18 and over, there were 102.2 males.

The median household income was $14,464 and the median family income was $17,750. Males had a median income of $33,438 and females $13,125. The per capita income for the town was $6,800. 20.0% of families and 33.6% of the population were living below the poverty line, including 43.2% of under eighteens and 8.7% of those over 64.

Notable people
 Kings of Leon, popular rock band
 Mato Kosyk, Sorbian writer

See also
List of towns in Oklahoma

Notes

References

External links
  Albion in Encyclopedia of Oklahoma History and Culture
 Photographs of Albion taken in 2009

Towns in Pushmataha County, Oklahoma
Towns in Oklahoma